"Muhammad Ali" is a song recorded by British dance band Faithless. It was released in the UK as a single on 23 September 2001, and was the second single release from the group's third studio album Outrospective. The German release was a DualDisc containing a CD audio side and a DVD side. Muhammad Ali reached #29 in the UK singles chart.

The single is about one of Maxi Jazz's heroes and major influences Muhammad Ali, who inspired Maxi to believe in himself and rise above racial taunts when he was younger.

One of the single covers contains a section of a picture from the Ali vs. Liston fight after Ali had knocked Liston to the floor.

Track listings

UK CD1
 Muhammad Ali (Radio Edit) - 03:31
 Muhammad Ali (Rollo & Sister Bliss Sweet Love Mix) - 07:18
 Muhammad Ali (Full Intention Club Mix) - 06:11

UK CD2
 Muhammad Ali (Radio Edit) - 03:31
 Muhammad Ali (Architechs Remix) - 05:22
 Muhammad Ali (Inland Knights Alley Mix) - 06:15

EU/Australian 
 Muhammad Ali (Radio Edit) - 03:31
 Muhammad Ali (Full Intention Club Remix) - 06:08
 Muhammad Ali (Inland Knights Alley Mix) - 06:14
 Muhammad Ali (Rollo & Sister Bliss Sweet Love Mix) - 07:18
 Muhammad Ali (Architechs Remix) - 05:39

German DualDisc Single

Side 1: CD Audio
 Muhammad Ali (Radio Edit) - 03:31
 Muhammad Ali (Full Intention Club Remix) - 06:08
 Muhammad Ali (Inland Knights Alley Mix) - 06:14
 Muhammad Ali (Rollo & Sister Bliss Sweet Love Mix) - 07:18
 Muhammad Ali (Architechs Remix) - 05:22
 Muhammad Ali (Rollo & Sister Bliss Tuff Love Mix) - 07:33

Side 2: Video
 Muhammad Ali [Video, Stereo and AC3 5.1 Mix] - 04:04
 Muhammad Ali (Live) [Video] - 04:47
 Muhammad Ali (Rollo & Sister Bliss Tuff Love Mix) [Video] - 07:33
 Behind The Scenes [Promo-Video for "Outrospective" including history and interviews, shot around Early 2001] - 12:28
 We Come 1 [Video] - 04:03

Chart positions

References

External links
FaithlessWeb.com
Faithless / Rollo / Sister Bliss & related artists - Unofficial Discography

2001 singles
Faithless songs
Songs about Muhammad Ali
Trip hop songs
2001 songs
Cheeky Records singles
Songs written by Rollo Armstrong
Songs written by Maxi Jazz
Songs written by Sister Bliss